Cumulative sentence may refer to:

Grammar
 Loose sentence, or cumulative sentence, a type sentence structure 
an independent clause followed by a series of dependent clauses (contrast with periodic sentence)

Law
 Consecutive terms of imprisonment. See Sentence (law)